The Canada–Central American Four Free Trade Agreement was a proposed free trade agreement between Canada and the Central American states of Guatemala, El Salvador, Honduras, and Nicaragua (collectively referred to as the Central American Four or CA4). Twelve rounds of negotiations were undertaken between 2001 and 2010, after which no agreement had been reached. Canada and Honduras instead decided to pursue a bilateral agreement between themselves, and those negotiations concluded successfully in August 2011.

The United States negotiated and ratified a similar treaty with these countries, called the Central American Free Trade Agreement. In a referendum on October 7, 2007, the voters of Costa Rica narrowly backed the free trade agreement with the U.S., with about 52 percent of "Yes" votes.

See also
 List of free trade agreements

Notes

References

External links
 Statement by the Canadian Council for International Co-operation

Politics of Central America
Proposed free trade agreements
Canada–Guatemala relations
Canada–El Salvador relations
Canada–Honduras relations
Economy of Central America